Phnom Penh Commercial Bank (PPCB) is a public bank of Cambodia. The bank was founded on 1 September 2008 with US$15m in paid in capital. The head office of the bank is located at #217, Norodom Blvd, Sangkat Tonle Bassac, Khan Chomkarmon.

The bank was established as a joint venture of Hyundai Swiss Savings Bank (now SBI Savings Bank) of South Korea, and SBI Group of Japan. The SBI Group has invested $6 million for a 40% interest in the new Cambodian bank while Hyundai Swiss Savings Bank has invested $8.55 million for a 57% stake. The remaining 3% investment was held by another South Korean financial group. The Phnom Penh Commercial Bank is Cambodia's 23rd commercial bank, and was the first bank launched by a Japanese company in Cambodia.

In 2016, the bank was acquired by a consortium of South Korean  and what is now OK Financial Group (a conglomerate run by Korean Japanese entrepreneurs), each obtaining 60% and 40% of stakes respectively. As a result, the bank is currently owned by two subsidiaries of JB Financial Group –  (a regional bank that primarily serves the North Jeolla Province; 50%) and JB Woori Capital (unrelated to neither Woori Financial Group nor its subsidiary Woori Bank; 10%) – and one subsidiary of OK Financial Group –  (which issues high-interest loans under the trade name of Rush & Cash; 40%).

Background 
The Phnom Penh Commercial Bank is one of a number of banks which have opened operations in Cambodia in the wake of several major changes in the domestic financial sector. In May 2007, Standard and Poor’s issued a historic first ever rating to a Cambodian bank. In 2008, the National Bank of Cambodia announced a change in the deposit requirements for all banks operating in Cambodia.

With growth rates of over 10% for the last three years, investors from Asian countries like South Korea and Japan were increasing direct foreign investment in Cambodia.

Services 
The bank offers several core personal banking services. It offers saving accounts, term deposits,  corporate and personal loans, automated teller machine and various corporate banking services. PPCB also offers various services for business like trade financing services, including documentary credits, shipping and airway guarantees, inward bills for collection, trust receipts and bills receivable financing. Bank guarantees and standby letters of credit are also available.

References

External links
 

Banks of Cambodia
Cambodian companies established in 2008
Banks established in 2008
Companies based in Phnom Penh